Dependency is an American Christian hardcore band, where they primarily play a hardcore punk and melodic hardcore styles of music. They come from Nashville, Tennessee. The band started making music in 2009. The band released an extended play, Convicted, in 2010, with Blood and Ink Records. Their subsequent release, Love Not Wasted, a studio album, was released by Blood and Ink Records, in 2012.

Background
Dependency is a Christian hardcore band from Nashville, Tennessee. Their members are lead vocalist, Kyle Fesmire, guitarists, David Hobbs and John Michael McCasland, bassist, Jonathan Dalman, and drummer, Charles Miller.

Music history
The band commenced as a musical entity in 2009, with their first release, Convicted, an extended play, that was released on May 25, 2010, from Blood and Ink Records. Their subsequent release, a studio album, Love Not Wasted, was released by Blood and Ink Records, on November 27, 2012.

Members
Current members
 Kyle Fesmire - vocals
 David Hobbs - guitar
 John Michael McCasland - guitar
 Jonathan Dalman - bass
 Charles Miller - drums

Discography
Studio albums
 Love Not Wasted (November 27, 2012, Blood and Ink)
EPs
 Convicted (May 25, 2010, Blood and Ink)

References

External links
 Facebook profile
 Blood and Ink Records

Musical groups from Nashville, Tennessee
2009 establishments in Tennessee
Musical groups established in 2009
Blood and Ink Records artists